Glenea elongatipennis is a species of beetle in the family Cerambycidae and was described by Stephan von Breuning in 1952.

References

elongatipennis
Beetles described in 1952